Lars Toborg (born 19 August 1975) is a German former professional footballer who played as a forward.

External links 

Living people
1975 births
Sportspeople from Bremerhaven
German footballers
Footballers from Bremen (state)
Association football forwards
2. Bundesliga players
FC Bremerhaven players
Rot-Weiß Oberhausen players
SV Wilhelmshaven players
Sportfreunde Siegen players
SG Wattenscheid 09 players
Rot Weiss Ahlen players